Richard Allen (1814 - 16 February 1884) was a stationer and publisher in Nottingham.

Background
He was born on 29 December 1814, the son of Edward Allen (1788-1863) of Leicester and Sarah Townsend (1792-1941).

He married firstly Catherine Morris (1816 - 2 October 1837) and they had one child.
Sarah Elizabeth Allen (1837-1929)

He married secondly Mary Ann Small (1810 - 1900), eldest daughter of William Small, on 12 July 1838 at Skirbeck and they had two children:
Edward Henry Allen (1840 - 1875)
Mary Adelaide Allen (1841 - 1901)

He took an active part in the establishment of the Park Company of the Robin Hood Rifles. He was also Provincial Grand Secretary of the Nottingham Freemasons.

He died on 16 February 1884 at his house Albert Villa, 21 Cavendish Crescent South, The Park, Nottingham and left an estate valued at £34,611 9s 1d..

Business interests

He succeeded to the business of Samuel Bennett in 1836, printer and publisher, based on Long Row in Nottingham and until 1847 issued the Nottingham and Newark Mercury, later shortened to the Nottingham Mercury, which was the organ of the Whig party in Nottingham.

He was based at Caxton House Photographic Studio, 34 Long Row, Nottingham and produced many Carte de visite for local people.

In June 1860 he installed a steam engine and Cameron’s patent boiler to power the printing presses and insured it with the Steam Boiler Assurance Company of Manchester On 10 December, the insurance company sent its inspector who discovered considerable leakage and corrosion but deemed the boiler safe to continue to use until Christmas when repairs could be made. On 14 December the boiler exploded but the insurance company refused to pay out which led to a Nisi prius court case in 1864 from which Richard Allen was awarded £58 in damages.

Later in life he converted his stationery and book-binding business into a limited liability company and he retired from the active management of it, but remained a director up until his death.

Publications
Allen’s Midland Counties’ Railway Companion 1840
Rules and Regulations to be observed by the Enginemen, Guards, Policemen and others employed on the Midland Railway 1842
The History and Antiquities of Charnwood Forest. With an Appendix on the Geology, Botany, and Ornithology of the District. Authors J.B. Jukes; Rev. Andrew Bloxam and Churchill Babington 1842
Allen’s Railway Time Table
Memoir of the late John Wolley. Author Alfred Newton 1860
Allen's Illustrated Hand-Book and Guide, to ... Nottingham and its Environs 1866
Red Book of Local Institutions 1867 onwards
History of Old Trent Bridge, With a Descriptive Account of the New Bridge, Nottingham. Illustrated by Photographs. author Marriott Ogle Tarbotton 1871
A souvenir of Newstead Abbey 1874
Nottingham Past and Present by Frederick Smeeton Williams 1877
Great Midland Almanack
Book of hunting songs and sport collected by Mrs Chaworth Musters 1885

References

1814 births
1884 deaths
19th-century publishers (people)
English book publishers (people)
People from Leicester
Companies based in Nottingham
History of Nottingham
19th-century English businesspeople